In photolithography, off-axis illumination is an optical system setup in which the incoming light strikes the photomask at an oblique angle rather than perpendicularly to it, that is to say, the incident light is not parallel to the axis of the optical system. 

The advantages of off-axis illumination can be explained in the context where the pattern on the photomask is a diffraction grating with a small pitch. The light that strikes the grating is diffracted in various directions. If the incident light is at a normal angle (along the axis of the optical system), then the zero-th diffracted order continues to be along the optical system axis, while the other orders are diffracted sideways, with the amount of deviation increasing as the pitch of the grating is decreasing. For sufficiently small pitch, only the zero-th diffraction order manages to make it through the projection lens, with the other orders being lost. The result is that no pattern is created on the wafer, since the zero-th diffraction order only contains the average of the photomask pattern.

By making the illumination off-axis, all the diffraction orders are tilted, which makes it more likely that the higher diffraction orders can make it through the projection lens and help form the image of the mask onto the wafer. 

Lithography (microfabrication)